Diego Javier de la Torre Muciño (born 5 February 1984) is a Mexican former professional footballer who played as a midfielder and current assistant coach for Major League Soccer club Atlanta United FC. De la Torre also has American citizenship, as his paternal grandmother was born in the United States. After the Apertura 2009 season, Diego was sent on loan to San Luis F.C. for the Clausura 2010 season, after playing his whole career with Toluca.

Honours
Cafetaleros de Tapachula
Ascenso MX: Clausura 2018

External links

1984 births
Living people
Liga MX players
Deportivo Toluca F.C. players
San Luis F.C. players
Querétaro F.C. footballers
Chiapas F.C. footballers
Association football midfielders
Footballers from San Luis Potosí
Mexican people of American descent
American sportspeople of Mexican descent
Atlético Mexiquense footballers
Atlanta United FC non-playing staff
Mexican footballers